Sophie Dusautoir Bertrand (born 5 June 1972) is an Andorran ski mountaineer.

Dusautoir was born in Andorra la Vella. She started ski mountaineering in 2002 and competed first in the  Cronoescalada Pas de la Casa race in 2005.

Selected results 
 2006:
 2nd, Spanish Championship vertical race
 2007:
 4th, Traça Catalana race
 7th, European Championship relay race (together with Neus Tort Gendrau and Ariadna Tudel Cuberes)
 8th, European Championship vertical race
 2008:
 9th, World Championship vertical tace
 2009:
 3rd, European Championship team race (together with Ariadna Tudel Cuberes)
 8th, European Championship single race
 2010:
 5th, World Championship single race
 5th, World Championship vertical race
 5th, World Championship combination ranking
 6th, World Championship team race (together with Ariadna Tudel Cuberes)
 8th, World Championship relay race (together with Ariadna Tudel Cuberes and Maria Segura Lanao)

Patrouille des Glaciers 

 2008: 5th ("seniors I" class ranking), mixed team together with Marie Troillet and Rico Elmer
 2010: 3rd, (and 1st in the "civilian women" ranking), together with Andréa Zimmermann and Catherine Mabillard

External links 
 Sophie Dusautoir Bertrand at Skimountaineering.org

References 

1972 births
Living people
Andorran female ski mountaineers